Jorge Antonio Cafrune  (Perico Del Carmen, Jujuy, August 8, 1937  – Buenos Aires, February 1, 1978) was one of the most popular Argentine folklorist singers of his time, as well as an unflagging researcher, compilator, and diffuser of the native culture.

Biography
Jorge Cafrune was born in the estancia "La Matilde" of El Sunchal, Perico Del Carmen, Jujuy in a family of Syrian–Lebanese origin. He completed his secondary studies in San Salvador de Jujuy, during which he took guitar classes with Nicolás Lamadrid.

In 1957 he recorded his first album with the band Las voces de Huayra that in 1960 changed its name to Los cantores del Alba, with Ariel Ramírez as manager. Beginning in 1962, Cafrune began to perform at the Cosquin Folkloric Festival. In 1966 in one of his visits to smaller villages, he met a young folklorist singer called José Larralde.

In 1967 shown the trip "De caballo por mi patria" in homage to Chacho Peñaloza. During this trip Cafrune traveled about Argentina as had many gauchos, taking his art and message around the country.

In 1977, after several years spent living in Spain, he returned to Argentina which was ruled at the time by the military dictatorship of Jorge Rafael Videla. The government saw a menace in Cafrune's outspoken music, particularly his politically controversial song Zamba de mi esperanza. On his persistence, Cafrune said, "Although it is not in the authorized repertoire, if my people request it of me, I am going to sing it." After being run over by a van driven by two nineteen-year-old men while riding a horse in a main road at 1 am, Cafrune died within twelve hours.

Discography

Compilations

Filmography

References

External links
Official website
Evidence incriminating Villanueva

1937 births
1978 deaths
Argentine male film actors
Argentine male guitarists
20th-century Argentine male singers
Argentine male singer-songwriters
People from Jujuy Province
Argentine people of Lebanese descent
Argentine people of Syrian descent
20th-century Argentine male actors
Assassinated Argentine people
20th-century guitarists
CBS Records artists
Argentine folk singers